The Valdés is a Mexican family consisting of famous comedians and singers.

Some notable members are:

Germán Valdés, a comedian ( "Tin-Tan").
Rosalía Valdés, an actress and singer daughter of Germán.
Manuel Valdés, a comedian brother of Germán (a.k.a. "el loco Valdés").
Cristian Castro, a famous singer son of Manuel and Verónica Castro (He has never used the name Valdés).
Marcos Valdés, an actor and singer son of Manuel.
Antonio Valdés, an comedian brother of Germán, Ramón and Manuel (a.k.a. "el ratón  Valdés").
Ramón Valdés, a comedian brother of Germán, Antonio and Manuel (a.k.a. "Moncho").

Mexican families